Stephen Kerins (born 1 May 1996) is an Irish rugby union player, who is currently playing for Ealing Trailfinders in the RFU Championship. He plays as a scrum-half.

Connacht
Whilst still in the academy, Kerins made his senior competitive debut for Connacht in their 33–27 away victory against French side Bordeaux Bègles during the 2018–19 Challenge Cup on 19 January 2019. Kerins will join the Connacht senior squad ahead of the 2019–20 season.

References

External links
Connacht Academy Profile

1996 births
Living people
People educated at Summerhill College
Rugby union players from County Galway
Irish rugby union players
Connacht Rugby players
Rugby union scrum-halves
Bristol Bears players
Ealing Trailfinders Rugby Club players